Valeri Borisovich Yerkovich (born 15 January 1951) is a Russian professional football coach and a former player.

External links
 

1951 births
People from Petropavl
Living people
Soviet footballers
Association football midfielders
FC Kairat players
FC Spartak Semey players
FC Sibir Novosibirsk players
FC Kuban Krasnodar players
FC Aktobe players
Soviet Top League players
Soviet football managers
Russian football managers
FC Sibir Novosibirsk managers